The 2016–17 Campeonato Nacional da Guiné-Bissau season is the top level of football competition in Guinea-Bissau. It began on 10 September 2016 and concluded on 21 May 2017.

Standings

References

Campeonato Nacional da Guiné-Bissau
Campeonato Nacional
Campeonato Nacional
Guinea-Bissau